Mohammad-Hossein Mahloujchi (also known as Hossein Mahlouji) is an Iranian politician. He served as the minister of mines and metals under president Akbar Hashemi Rafsanjani and a member of parliament for three terms during 1980s.

References

1947 births
Living people
Moderation and Development Party politicians
Islamic Republican Party politicians
Government ministers of Iran
Governors of Isfahan
Members of the 1st Islamic Consultative Assembly
Members of the 2nd Islamic Consultative Assembly
Members of the 3rd Islamic Consultative Assembly
Iranian mechanical engineers
Impeached Iranian officials